Thrilling is a 1965 Italian comedy film. The film is split into three distinct segments, each directed by a different director; namely Carlo Lizzani, Ettore Scola and Gian Luigi Polidoro.

Cast

Il vittimista 
 Directed by Ettore Scola
 Nino Manfredi as Nanni Galassi
 Alexandra Stewart as Frida
 Tino Buazzelli as The Shrink
 Magda Konopka as Luciana
 Milena Vukotic as The Laboratory Assistant

Sadik 
 Directed by Gian Luigi Polidoro
Walter Chiari as Bertazzi
Dorian Gray as Veronique

L'autostrada del sole 
 Directed by Carlo Lizzani
Alberto Sordi as Fernando Boccetta
Sylva Koscina as Paola
Giampiero Albertini as Il Rosso
Alessandro Cutolo as Eraldo
Nicoletta Machiavelli
Federico Boido
Renato Terra

References

External links 

 

1965 films
1960s Italian-language films
Films directed by Gian Luigi Polidoro
Films directed by Ettore Scola
Films directed by Carlo Lizzani
1965 comedy films
Commedia all'italiana
Films scored by Ennio Morricone
Films with screenplays by Ruggero Maccari
Italian black comedy films
Films with screenplays by Ettore Scola
1960s Italian films